Eurypoena is a monotypic genus of comb-footed spiders containing the single species, Eurypoena tuberosa. The species was first described by J. Wunderlich in 1992 who then created the genus in 1992. It is found on the Canary Islands.

See also
 List of Theridiidae species

References

Monotypic Araneomorphae genera
Spiders of the Canary Islands
Theridiidae